Walter Mead (1 April 1868 – 18 March 1954) was the principal bowler for Essex during their first two decades as a first-class county. As a member of the Lord’s ground staff, he was also after J.T. Hearne the most important bowler for MCC and Ground, who in those days played quite a number of first-class matches.

A right arm bowler of slow to medium pace, Walter Mead always maintained an excellent length and could spin back to deadly effect whenever wickets were affected by rain. He could vary his stock off break with a ball that turned the other way, but he lacked the deceptive flight that enabled such bowlers as Blythe, Dennett or J.C. White to do well on firm pitches. He rarely did much as a batsman, but when sent in as night-watchman against Leicestershire in 1902 he surprised the crowd so much by making 119 that there was a special collection for him as a reward.

Even before Essex had been elevated to first-class status, Walter Mead already had a reputation as a bowler of class. Against the touring Australian in 1893 he took seventeen wickets, but the following year when Essex became first-class he was disappointing on pitches that should have helped him, taking only 41 wickets in eight inter-county matches for 21 each. In 1895, however, after a slow start, he became deadly when wickets became sticky during the middle of July. For the whole summer Mead obtained a record of 179 wickets for less than fifteen runs apiece, and his 17 for 119 against Hampshire is the second best bowling for a losing side in first-class cricket, behind William Mycroft in 1876 (also against Hampshire). Only Tich Freeman has since taken seventeen wickets twice in matches of comparable importance.

1896 and 1897, with most pitches unfavourable to him due to dry weather, were disappointing, but Mead gradually rebounded in the following years. An excellent performance against the Australians in 1899 saw Mead chosen for his only Test match at Lord's, but he was harmless on the hard pitch. He remained close to the top of the first-class averages for every season from 1899 to 1903 – though in 1901 he was helped by some very bad Lord's wickets when playing for the MCC – and in the last-named year was chosen as a Cricketer of the Year by Wisden after heading the first-class bowling averages with best match figures of twelve for 76 against Surrey at the Oval and fifteen for 115 against Leicestershire at Leyton.

However, over the 1903/1904 winter Walter Mead's career with Essex terminated temporarily as a result of a dispute over winter pay. They missed him badly in 1904 and 1905, and by 1906 he had agreed to return to the eleven. Considering the remarkable dryness of the 1906 summer in the Home Counties, he bowled very well, and in 1907 he was almost as difficult as ever on the soft pitches. In 1908, however, Walter Mead declined so badly, taking only 48 County Championship wickets, that it was clear his best days were over. Despite a minor revival in 1910 and 1911, when Mead failed to make the most of continuous soft wickets in 1912 it was clear his career was over, so that he dropped out of the eleven before 1913 ended despite Essex having no spin bowler to replace him. 

Mead left the Lord's ground staff in 1918.  His son, Harold, also played some first-class cricket for Essex, although he died in 1921 after never fully recovering from wounds he sustained during World War I.  Mead died at the age of eighty-five in 1954.

External links

1868 births
1954 deaths
People from Upper Clapton
Essex cricketers
England Test cricketers
English cricketers
Wisden Cricketers of the Year
Marylebone Cricket Club cricketers
London County cricketers
North v South cricketers
Players cricketers
East of England cricketers
Players of the South cricketers
C. I. Thornton's XI cricketers